Dorothy Morrison may refer to:

Dorothy Morrison (actress) (1919–2017), African-American child actress
Dorothy Combs Morrison (born 1944), American gospel music singer
Dorothy Morrison (author) (born 1955), American writer and teacher of magic, Wicca and Neo-Paganism